Rakel Mateo Uriate (born 13 June 1975) is a Spanish paratriathlete who competes in international level events. She is three time Spanish paratriathlon champion and double European medalist.

Mateo Uriate sustained paralysis in her left leg after an accident in 2001.

References

1975 births
Living people
Sportspeople from Biscay
Spanish female triathletes
Paratriathletes of Spain
Paratriathletes at the 2016 Summer Paralympics
Triathletes from the Basque Country (autonomous community)
People from Mungialdea
Paratriathletes at the 2020 Summer Paralympics
21st-century Spanish women